Emeline Michel, born in Gonaïves, is a Haitian singer who has been called "The Joni Mitchell of Haiti." Her songs merge native Haitian compas and rara music with jazz, pop, bossa nova, and samba. She's a well accomplished dancer, versatile vocalist, songwriter and producer. She sang a version of Jimmy Cliff's Many Rivers to Cross at Hope for Haiti Now: A Global Benefit for Earthquake Relief.

Photos

References

External links 
Emeline Michel's official site

21st-century Haitian women singers
People from Gonaïves
Living people
Year of birth missing (living people)